Military Secretary is a senior position in the Army Headquarters of the Indian Army, the post is a headed by a senior officer of the Lieutenant General rank. Military Secretary controls appointments of officers above the rank of Lieutenant except the Medical Corps.

Military Secretary is also responsible for promotions, postings, tenures and for the grant of honorary ranks in Indian Army. The Military Secretary is one of seven Principal Staff Officers of the Indian Army.

Military Secretaries
Lt Gen Avadhesh Prakash
Lt Gen G. M. Nair, PVSM, AVSM, SM, VSM.
Lt Gen C. R. Sampath Kumar, PVSM, AVSM, VSM, Colonel of the Regiment - Artillery 
Lt Gen Syed Ata Hasnain, PVSM, UYSM, AVSM, SM, VSM & BAR
Lt Gen Shakti Gurung, PVSM, UYSM, AVSM, VSM, Colonel of the Regiment - Grenadiers. 
Lt Gen Rajiv Bhalla, PVSM, AVSM, SM, VSM
 Lt Gen G. S. Gill
 Lt Gen JS Sandhu
 Lt Gen Anil Kumar Bhatt
 LT Gen Rajeev Sirohi, AVSM, VSM

References
ORGANIZATIONAL STRUCTURE OF INDIAN ARMY

Indian Army
Indian military appointments
Indian Army appointments